The 1993–94 Sheffield Shield season was the 92nd season of the Sheffield Shield, the domestic first-class cricket competition of Australia. New South Wales won the championship.

Table

Final

References

Sheffield Shield
Sheffield Shield
Sheffield Shield seasons